The following is a list of Alabama Crimson Tide men's basketball head coaches. The Crimson Tide have had 21 head coaches in their 109-season history.

Alabama's current head coach is Nate Oats. He was hired in March 2019 to replace Avery Johnson, who was let go by Alabama a few days earlier.

References

Alabama

Alabama Crimson Tide men's basketball coaches